Jennifer Devine (born December 19, 1968) is an American rower. She competed at the 2004 Summer Olympics in Athens, in the women's single sculls. Devine was born in Portland, Oregon.

References

1968 births
Living people
American female rowers
Olympic rowers of the United States
Rowers at the 1996 Summer Olympics
Rowers at the 2004 Summer Olympics
Sportspeople from Portland, Oregon
21st-century American women